ThouShaltNot were an American electronic band formed in 1998. Their core lineup consisted of Alex Reed, Aaron Fuleki, and Jeremy Long. The band's musical style blended elements of post-punk, gothic rock, industrial, and synthpop. Based in Pittsburgh, Pennsylvania, they were signed to Dancing Ferret Discs. The group released four studio albums before disbanding in 2013, with Reed and Fuleki continuing to record music under the name Seeming.

Biography
The band started as vocalist Alex Reed's solo project, though Aaron Fuleki, whom Reed met as a freshman at The College of Wooster, joined the band in 1999.  When ThouShaltNot relocated from Cleveland to Pittsburgh in 2001, Jeremy David Long joined the band.  All three are classically trained musicians; Reed earned a Ph.D. in music composition and theory from the University of Pittsburgh in 2005.  ThouShaltNot's music is generally complex, carefully orchestrated, and spiritual.

ThouShaltNot first signed with ADSR Musicwerks, releasing two albums of new material (a self-titled release and The Holiness of Now) as well as a rarities collection, You'll Wake Up Yesterday.   The Holiness of Now gave them their first minor hit, "Without Faith," and You'll Wake Up Yesterday features their song "If I Only Were a Goth"; this song became quite popular and somewhat notorious at their live shows because the band traditionally limits it to the first live show in a new city as well as for its affectionate ridiculing of the gothic subculture.  They were next signed by Dancing Ferret Discs, who have released their 2003 album The White Beyond and their 2006 album Land Dispute, as well as re-issuing The Holiness of Now.  The White Beyond has been their most successful release to date, with "Cardinal Directions" and "Inside of You, In Spite of You" both receiving extensive club play.  The band has gone on several U.S. tours, sharing the stage with such artists as VNV Nation, The Dresden Dolls, and David J of Bauhaus.  They have also provided remixes for many synthpop and goth acts, including Alphaville, Hungry Lucy, Stromkern, and The Last Dance.

Members

Final lineup
 Alex Reed - vocals, keyboards, guitars, bass, programming, samples (1998-2013)
 Aaron "Foo" Fuleki - percussion, programming, samples, guitars, backing vocals (1999-2013)
 Jeremy David Long - guitars, bass, backing vocals, piano, keyboards, programming (2001-2013)

Former members
 Sarah Hans - keyboards, vocals (touring member)
 Megan Hancock - cello (touring member)
 The band maintains an exhaustive list of additional musicians whom they have used on their official FAQ.

Discography

Albums
 The Deepest Ice (1999, self-released demo album)
 ThouShaltNot (2000, ADSR Musicwerks)
 The Holiness of Now (2001, ADSR Musicwerks; reissued by Dancing Ferret Discs in 2003)
 The White Beyond (2003, Dancing Ferret Discs)
 Land Dispute (2006, Dancing Ferret Discs)

EPs
 You'll Wake Up Yesterday (2002, ADSR Musicwerks)
 Vier Factor No. 1 (split with The Crüxshadows, Paralysed Age, and The Dreamside, 2003, Dancing Ferret Discs)
 The Projectionist (2005, independent release)
 New World EP (2008, independent release)

Remixes
 Hungry Lucy - Glo - "Telltale Shot," "Stay" (on European version) (2003 Alpha Matrix / Hungry Media)
 Furnace St. - People - "Sunday Driver" (2003, Furnasty Music)
 Alphaville - Crazyshow - "Inside Out" (2003 Alphaville)
 The Last Dance - Reflections of Rage - "Voices" (2004, Dancing Ferret Discs)
 Lunascape - Mindstalking - "Mindstalking" (2005, Dancing Ferret Discs)
 Stromkern - Reminders - "Reminders" (2006, WTII Records)
 Iris - "Imposter" - Electronic Saviors: Industrial Music To Cure Cancer (2010, Metropolis Records)
 Caustic - "Chewing Glass at the Zoo" - Douche Ex Machina (2011, Metropolis Records)

Alex Reed's solo work
 Better Roads EP (2004, independent release)
 The Gothic (2018, independent release)
 Midnight to Midnight (2020, independent release), written in 24 hours as the first album of 2020

As "Thou Flaming Minister"
 "Upwards of the Hilt" appears on the compilation Transmission Vol. 1 (1996, New World Order Records)
 Remix of "Disevolve" by Zia appears on the Disevolve EP  (1998, Zia Music)
 Excavate cassette (1998, independent; only distributed at their first concert)
 Catalepsy (1998, independent short-run CD-R)

Exclusive Compilation Appearances
 "Trench Warfare (Midnight mix)" on Only Sorrow (2001, Ellen Claire Lawrence Memorial Scholarship)
 "The Sting (Proto mix)" on Chartreuse Translucent Sampler (2001, Chartreuse Translucent)
 "Cardinal Directions (Directionless mix)" on Asleep By Dawn, vol. 1 (2003, Asleep By Dawn)
 "When Everyone Forgets" on Where's Neil When You Need Him? (2006, Dancing Ferret Discs)
 "Sick" on Electronic Saviors: Industrial Music To Cure Cancer (2010, Metropolis Records)

Various other album tracks have appeared on CDs packaged with music magazines and on label samplers by both ADSR Musicwerks and Dancing Ferret Discs.

References

External links
 Official homepage
 Official MySpace site
 
 ThouShaltNot statistics and tagging at Last.FM
 

American dark wave musical groups
American synth-pop groups
Musical groups from Pittsburgh
Rock music groups from Pennsylvania